Adrian Parr (born 1967) is an Australian-born philosopher and cultural critic. She specializes in environmental philosophy and activism. In addition, she published on the sustainability movement, climate change politics, activist culture, and creative practice.

Biography
Parr was born in Sydney Australia. Her father, Mike Parr, and her aunt, Julie Rrap, are contemporary Australian artists who introduced Parr to the world of activist culture at an early age.

She completed her bachelor's degree with First Class Honors in Philosophy at Deakin University in 1998, followed by a Master's in Philosophy in 2000. She began her PhD studies under the direction of the feminist philosopher Claire Colebrook. Parr's PhD dissertation "Creative Production: From Da Vinci to Deleuze" was revised and published by Edwin Mellen Press in 2003.

Between 2003 and 2006 she was a professor of cultural criticism at Savannah College of Art and Design. Whilst in Savannah, Parr co-founded (with Avantika Bawa and Celina Jeffery) Drain: A Journal of Contemporary Art and Culture.

In 2006 she moved to the University of Cincinnati. Parr was a tenured Full Professor with a joint appointment in the Department of Political Science and the School of Architecture and the Interior Design at the University of Cincinnati. In 2011 she was awarded the Rieveschl Award for Scholarly and Creative Work. This distinguished award recognizes a University of Cincinnati faculty for professional achievement in creative and scholarly work.  In 2013, she was appointed Director of The Charles Phelps Taft Research Center and Chair of Taft Faculty.

In 2013, Parr was one of the speakers at the "March Against Monsanto" rally held in Cincinnati, Ohio. The Cincinnati rally was part of a national movement of protests that called attention to the dangers of using genetically modified food. The protest spotlighted the companies that use genetically modified food.

In 2013 Parr was appointed as UNESCO water chair. In July 2017, she was one of the founding signatories for the Geneva Actions on Human Water Security. 

In March 2018, Parr was appointed Dean of the College of Architecture, Planning and Public Affairs (CAPPA) at the University of Texas at Arlington (UTA). In November 2020, Parr was named incoming Dean of the College of Design at the University of Oregon.

Public outreach

In November 2013, Adrian Parr and Michael Zaretsky co-directed the Future Cities; Livable Futures symposium, a public event that provided a platform for attendees to share and discuss the future of urban life. Future Cities; Livable Futures featured an interdisciplinary panel of speakers focused on topics such as sustainable urban development, increasing population, inadequate infrastructure, poor social services, escalating health problems, and challenges posed by climate change.  Both Parr and Zaretsky were interviewed on public radio about sustainable urban development and their notion of livable cities.  Parr was interviewed by public radio for her views on environmental racism.  Then again on CBS where she described Hurricane Harvey as more of a man-made disaster than a natural disaster.

In 2014 Parr founded Louder Than A Bomb Cincy. She worked with local organizations, University of Cincinnati affiliations, spoken-word poets, and Cincinnati public school district teachers to bring what is the largest youth poetry slam in the nation, to Cincinnati. According to an article in the News Record, "LTAB was originally founded in Chicago in 2001 through nonprofit Young Chicago Authors as a festival for young spoken word artists of diverse cultural backgrounds to gather and engage in performances of their poetry."She has been interviewed on national public radio and television for her work directing the Louder Than A Bomb Cincy program.  Her interviews have included 2016 interview with NPR, a 2015 interview with WVXU Chanel 5, and an earlier 2015 NPR interview with Bill Reinhardt.

In addition to community outreach, Parr has spoken on and been interviewed for her views on climate change, environmental degradation, and sustainable development. In her capacity as a UNESCO water chair, she is strong advocate for water justice. In a NPR interview for World Water Day Parr speaks of the ongoing struggle for clean, accessible, and affordable water the world over. Again on public radio she speaks of the connection between environmental racism and the struggles of Native American communities to survive the rising seas and the contamination of their water supplies. Later, in a television interview with the Newsmakers, Parr describes Hurricane Harvey as more of a man-made than a natural disaster.

In an interview for The New York Times with journalist Natasha Lennard, Parr discusses how environmental damage and climate change are not only forms violence but a crime against humanity. In his op-ed in The New York Times Brad Evans, the founder/director of the Histories of Violence Project expanded upon Parr's framework of climate violence explaining that environmental degradation is a crime against humanity.  Evans writes, Parr "also posed the question of what a crime against humanity actually means in such a context. It turns out, there are many ways in which damage to the environment rises to that level. This type of violence presents profound existential questions about what it means to be human and the ontological crimes (i.e., a crime against the human as such) some of us wage against ourselves."

Films
In 2016, Parr produced, wrote, and narrated her first documentary, The Intimate Realities of Water.   Parr co-directed the film with Sean Hughes.  In addition, Sean Hughes was the editor and Jon Hughes, his father was the director of photography. When the documentary was released in 2016, it was screened it was screened at numerous independent film festivals in the United States where it went on to win 13 awards.

The film follows the lives of four women living in the slums of Nairobi, documenting the water and sanitation challenges they face. National public radio featured an interview with Parr and the film team where they discussed the making of the film.

From 2014-2017 Parr produced and directed the TAFTtalks and H2Otalks series.  TAFTtalks concentrate on drawing out issues of interest beyond the academy and focus on big, contemporary ideas, and concerns.  Among those she has interviewed for TAFTtalks include Tara Houska and Rosi Braidotti.  Houska is a staunch activist of Native American rights.  She is an Ojibwe of Saulteaux, Couchiching First Nation and is the founding board member of Not Your Mascots. Houska was also the Native American adviser for Bernie Sanders, during his presidential campaign, and Houska is the National Campaigns Director for Honor the Earth.  Braidotti is a Distinguished University Professor and the director of the Centre for the Humanities at Utrecht University in the Netherlands.

The H2Otalks were featured as a part of the 50th anniversary of the UNESCO Water Programmes during the 38th UNESCO General Conference, as part of the "50 Years, 50 Movies on Water," in November 2015.  Those she has interviewed include prominent environmentalist Bill McKibben.

Writing 

Parr has published numerous books on environmental politics, the built environment, and cultural production.

 
Her most recent book, Birth Of A New Earth, was published by Columbia University Press in 2017.  In his endorsement of the book, 350.org founder Bill McKibben writes "As Adrian Parr suggests in a timely fashion, imagination may be the best weapon we have in the fight against environmental destruction, as useful as a new engine or a bigger windmill."  Ananya Roy, author of Poverty Capital: Microfinance and the Making of Development, describes Parr's book, as "one that not only provides a rigorous and critical analysis of emergent environmentalism but also charts how imaginations of a 'new earth' can be forged at the limits of liberal democracy.  In this sense, the book is as much about the political as it is about the environment.  It is a must-read for our times." Henry Giroux, author of America at War with Itself, noted that "Birth Of A New Earth is one of those rare and brilliant books that critiques the ongoing destruction of the environment in a writing style that is lyrical compassionate and as accessible as it is informative. Parr masterfully weaves together a language of critique and possibility and in doing so makes a convincing case of environmental and economic justice on a global scale and offers a powerful argument for rethinking the meaning and practice of politics." The book explores how activists and popular movements are fighting the environmental crisis of climate change and the ongoing devastation of the earth.  The influence of the growing environment can be seen in how corporate mission statements, government policy, and national security agendas now focus much more on sustainability.  Parr maintains political scenarios for change often pursue either a revolutionary platform or a reformist agenda.  She argues these are false choices as she advocates for an emancipatory political imagination, maintaining that environmental politics engages the twofold problem of democratization and decolonization. 
 
This monograph has been commended by a number of experts in the environmental profession.  Raj Patel, the author of the two books Stuffed and Starved and the Value of Nothing, said of Parr's book, "With this short, pointed, and very welcome text, Parr blends political theory and startling fact to refresh our understanding about the capitalist roots of environmental change."  Parr's work investigates the intersection of social and environmental justice issues, arguing that the neoliberalism framework is hurting climate change talks and policy. Parr concentrates on how those with the most economic power continue to have control over the environmental change discourse. Many scholars felt this work contributed greatly to the field.  In a positive review of this work, M. M. Gunter Jr., of Rollins College in Winter Park, Fla., wrote Parr "presents an engaging, hard-cutting critique of neoliberalism, arguing more transformative politics are needed to address climate change and sustainability problems worldwide but that a ‘Trojan horse’ of market mechanisms under the dominant neoliberal paradigm prevents viable alternatives from emerging."  In Global Environmental Politics, Rebecca Pearse, a research associate working on the Global Arenas of Knowledge at the University of Sydney, writes that the book gives scholars and activists, who are looking for an introduction of leftist critiques on environmental politics, will receive a good summary from Parr’s book.  Critical of this work, John Bellamy Foster, a sociology professor at the University of Oregon, writes in "Contemporary Sociology," Parr "confuses matters by providing seemingly conflicting definitions of ‘neoliberalism,’ which she describes as (1) ‘a more virulent strain’ of the liberalism inherited from Adam Smith,’ (2) ‘a cultural mode of production that in turn defines the political economy,’ and (3) a particular ‘agenda.'"  He says Parr allows readers to use words such as "capital," "capitalism, and "the law of value," interchangeably, when the three words have three, different meanings.  Ryder W. Miller, a freelance environmental and science reporter based in San Francisco, writes in the Electronic Green Journal (2013), that Parr focuses too much on drawbacks of the environmental movement and does not acknowledge all the achievements of the movement. 

Along with Michael Zaretsky, a University of Cincinnati professor, Parr edited this anthology on sustainable design and development initiatives, combining the viewpoints of practitioners and scholars.  The central idea is that sustainable design is not merely about material production but also about changing the way people live, their relationship to the world, and one another.  This text combines a number of essays from recognized experts in sustainability practices, in theory, and design to construction, on order to develop a comprehensive approach to thinking, designing, building, and living sustainably. According to WorldCat, the book is held in 228 libraries  

· In this work, Parr argues that contemporary environmental activism, rather than helping redress environmental issues, is actually hurting these same issues.  She uses five examples of where the capitalists are hijacking sustainability: corporate image-greening, Hollywood activism, gated communities, the greening of the White House, and the incongruous efforts to achieve a ‘sustainable’ army. These examples are used to help explain how architecture, especially urban spaces, add to global inequality by contributing more distinct boundaries between areas with and without poverty.    This work received several positive reviews. Jean Hillier, a professor at RMIT University's School of Global, Urban & Social Studies in Australia, writes when reviewing "Hijacking Sustainability," in the journal of "Deleuze Studies," that "Parr maps the physical as well as intellectual spaces that construct boundaries between ‘normal/indecent, honest/criminal, and neighborly/threatening’ (135)."  Antonelli Monika, an associate professor at Minnesota State University, writes in, "the Electric Green Journal," that Parr's work "is a needed addition to environmental literature field due to the fact that there is limited information available on the attack on and the greenwashing of sustainability" (p. 209). Daniel Barber, an associate professor and associate chair at the University of Pennsylvania's School of Design, wrote in the "American Book Review" journal that "Parr’s (piece) is the most theoretically sophisticated of this recent wave of environmentalist critique, and she provides a valuable interpretation of sustainability through the frameworks of Gilles Deleuze and Felix Guattari and Michael Hardt and Antonio Negri" (p. 4).  In a critical review of this work, R. Moore, with the University of Toronto, argues that Parr failed to adequately define the core term "sustainability." While a difficult task, greater clarity is required in order to avoid an argument that is "at best vague and at worst incomprehensible" (p. 284).  Failing to clarify the term "sustainability culture," Moore contends that readers do not get a good description of the type of individuals and organizations who can further environmental progress without adding to the capitalistic machine.  Monika notes she would like to see Parr add solutions about way people can fix this problem of "Hijacking Sustainability."According to WorldCat, the book is held in 420 libraries 

This work combines critical theory, cultural studies, and media theory with empirical research to describe the political scope of collective remembrance of traumatic events, e.g., the event of 9/11, the Holocaust, and the Amish shooting in Pennsylvania. Parr argues that memorialization, e.g., monuments marking a tribute, is not a means of capturing a definitive, implicitly negative historical truth of events but is, instead, a form of cultural production of a collective memory, which offers means of positive therapeutic outcomes for a group of people.
  
Co-edited this anthology with Ian Buchanan, now the director of the Institute for Social Transformation Research based at the University of Wollongong, the goal of this book is to show how Deleuzian concepts can be seen in today's political concerns.  Contributors use Deleuzian theories when explaining a number of real-world issues, e.g., the Holocaust, immigration, and the Israeli/Palestinian conflict. Parr and Buchanan here defend Deleuzian concepts from some of their largest critics, many of whom attack Deleuze concepts as too abstract or idealistic. Contributors to this book include Nicholas Thoburn, senior lecturer in sociology at the University of Manchester; Kenneth Surin, Professor of Literature and Professor of Religion and Critical Theory at Duke University; Rosi Braidotti, Distinguished University Professor at Utrecht University and director of the Centre for the Humanities in Ultrect, in the Netherlands; Verena Andermatt Conley, Visiting Professor at Harvard University; Paul Patton, Philosophy Professor at the University of New South Wales, in Sydney, Australia; Eugene W. Holland, Comparative Studies professor at Ohio State University; Patricia Pisters, Professor of Media Studies at the University of Amsterdam; and Colebrook (who is mentioned above).   According to WorldCat, the book is held in 217 libraries 

First published by Columbia University Press in 2005, the book was subsequently expanded and published 2010 by both Columbia University Press and Edinburgh University Press. In the 2010 edition, Parr makes a new connection between Deleuze's more recent work and architecture, cinema, psychoanalysis, biology, and geography.  An expanded bibliography is also included. The book includes more than 150 entries, with some focus on individuals who have impacted Deleuze's work such as Spinoza, Nietzsche, Kafka, Hume, Leibniz, and Bergson, while the majority of the entries focus on Deleuze's main oppositional concepts, e.g., molar/molecular, exteriority/interiority, and deterritorialization/reterritorialization. To help readers, many of the entries provided a list of "’connectives,’" which point readers toward other sections in the dictionary.  According to WorldCat, the book is held in 502 libraries   Revised edition released 2010
 
Parr reworked and published her dissertation under a new title, with Edwin Mellen Press. This work examines the connections between science, technology, philosophy, art, and design developing a concept of creative production. Looking at the da Vinci’s sketchbooks and work, Parr analyzes his method of creative production, arguing that da Vinci takes and reworks what is real, through an imaginative process, allowing a new reality to emerge.  According to WorldCat, the book is held in 103 libraries 

Parr is a regular contributor to the LA Review of Books series on violence.  She has interviewed Serbian performance artist, Marina Abramović, spoken word artist Malcolm London, and sound artist David Rothenberg.  She has written on environmental politics and climate change for a number of publications including Equitable Action on Climate Now (October 2013) for the World Financial Review and Selective Amnesia (February 2015) for the European Magazine.

List of awards and honors 
 Received an ARC (Australia Research Council) Linkage Grant of AU$272,000 for a project, "Curating Cities: A Database of Eco Public Art," 2011.
 George Rieveschl Jr. Award for Creative and/or Scholarly Works, University of Cincinnati, 2011.
 Hillier Memorial Lecture, Cornell University, 2011.
 Parr received the following awards for her documentary, "The Intimate Realities of Water."
 Best Documentary—United International Independent Film Festival in 2016
 Finalist Best Documentary—Paris Art Movie Awards, 2016.
 Best Cultural Feature—Hollywood International Independent Awards, 2016
 Best Writer—Hollywood International Independent Awards, 2016
 Best Narration—Hollywood International Independent Awards, 2016
 Official Selection—the Louisville International Film Festival, 2016
 Board of Directs Award—North Carolina Film Awards, 2016
 Best Picture—Los Angeles Independent Film Festival, 2016
 Best Woman Film Maker—Los Angeles Independent Film Festival, 2016
 Best First-time Film Maker—Los Angeles Independent Film Festival, 2016
 Best Documentary Director—Los Angeles Independent Film Festival, 2016
 Excellent Award for voice over—Depth of Field Film Festival, 2016
 Outstanding Excellence—Best Content/Message Delivery, 2016
 Humanitarian Award (Honorable Mention) -- IndieFEST, 2016
 Bronze REMI award (ecology/environment) -- Houston International Film Festival (2017)

Quotes 
"Environmental degradation is calling us to the witness stand of history. It demands we testify against ourselves and mount a case in our defense. Ultimately, we are all agents of history. To reduce ourselves to a role of mere observation is to deny us of our humanity." – Adrian Parr, The New York Times, May 2016

References

External links
  Mark Watkins, ‘Greenwashing the Globe’, Fast Forward Weekly, 15 October 2009. 
 ‘Curating Cities’, Customs House Sydney, Tuesday 22 November 2011.
 ‘Building Sustainable Communities’, 27 February – 7 March 2012. Fresh Outlook Foundation. 
Adrian Parr Interviewed by Scott Wegener, WCPO, 22 April 2011. 
'Passion’, TedXCincy, 7 October 2010

1967 births
21st-century Australian philosophers
Continental philosophers
Monash University alumni
Sustainability advocates
University of Cincinnati faculty
Living people
20th-century Australian philosophers
Australian women philosophers
Australian women sociologists
Deleuze scholars